Karamangalam  is a village in the  
Arimalamrevenue block of Pudukkottai district 
, Tamil Nadu, India.

Demographics 

As per the 2001 census, Karamangalam had a total population of  
1837 with 916 males and 921 females. Out of the total  
population 1206 people were literate.

References

Villages in Pudukkottai district